Diptychophlia is a genus of sea snails, marine gastropod mollusks in the family Borsoniidae.

Species
Species within the genus Diptychophlia include:
 Diptychophlia hubrechti Cunha, 2005
 Diptychophlia occata (Hinds, 1843)

References

External links
  Bouchet P., Kantor Yu.I., Sysoev A. & Puillandre N. (2011) A new operational classification of the Conoidea. Journal of Molluscan Studies 77: 273-308.

 
Gastropod genera